Bornholms stemme is a 1999 Danish comedy film directed by , starring Sofie Stougaard and . The film takes place in a small fishing island off the coast of Sweden during a no-fishing period imposed in 1982, because of overfishing. The main characters are the stubborn fisher Lars Erik (Lykkegaard) and his wife Sonja (Stougaard).

Cast 
 Sofie Stougaard – Sonja
  – Lars Erik
  - Karen
 Isidor Torkar – Francisco
 Thomas Bo Larsen – Ib
  - Bibi
  - Flemse

References

External links 
 
 Bornholms stemme at Filmweb.no (Norwegian)

1999 comedy films
1999 films
Danish comedy films
1990s Danish-language films